The Suffolk Nuts were a minor league baseball team based in Suffolk, Virginia. In 1915 and from 1919 to 1921, Suffolk teams played as members of the Virginia League, hosting minor league home games at Peanut Park. Suffolk teams did not win a Virginia League championship, with fifth place being the highest finish for the franchise.

History
After Norfolk first hosted minor league baseball with the 1911 Suffolk championship team of the Tidewater League, the "Nuts" were preceded in minor league play by the 1915 Suffolk Tigers of the Class C level Virginia League. The Tigers finished the 1915 season in fifth place in the six-team league with a record of 59-62. The Suffolk Tigers folded from the Virginia League following the 1915 season, replaced in 1916 league play by the Hopewell Powder Puffs.

In 1919, the Suffolk "Nuts" rejoined the Virginia League, which was a six–team, Class C level league. The Newport News Shipbuilders, Norfolk Tars, Petersburg Goobers, Portsmouth Truckers and Richmond Colts joined Suffolk in beginning league play on May 8, 1919.

The Suffolk use of the "Nuts" moniker corresponded with local peanut agriculture and production in the city. Suffolk was self–nicknamed as the "Peanut Capitol of the World." The team played home games at Peanut Park, located next to the Suffolk Peanut Company.

In their first season of play, the Suffolk Nuts placed fifth in the Virginia League final standings. The Nuts ended the regular season with a record of 49–58, finishing 12.0 games behind the first place Petersburg Goobers. The league did not hold playoffs. Rube Oldring served as the Suffolk manager. 

Playing the 1920 season under manager Gabby Street, who had played for Suffolk in 1915, the Nuts placed seventh as the Virginia League expanded to eight teams. Street would later manage the 1931 St. Louis Cardinals to the World Series championship and become a longtime Cardinals radio announcer.  Under Street, Suffolk ended the 1920 season with a record of 47–69 in the Virginia League season standings. The Nuts finished the season 30.0 games behind the first place Richmond Colts in the final standings.

In 1921, Suffolk became known as the "Wildcats," as the Virginia League was upgraded to become a Class B level league and held a playoff for the first time. The Suffolk Wildcats ended the Virginia League regular season in sixth place with a record of 59–78, finishing 20.5 games behind the first place Portsmouth Truckers. Managed by the returning Gabby Street and Bill Cunningham, Suffolk did not qualify for the playoff, won by Portsmouth over the Norfolk.

The Virginia League reduced from eight teams to six for the 1922 season and the Suffold franchise was folded, along with the Tarboro Tarbabies. Suffolk, Virginia next hosted minor league baseball when the 1948 Suffolk Goobers returned to play when the Virginia League reformed.

The ballpark
The Suffolk Nuts and other Virginia League teams hosted home minor league home games at "Peanut Park." The ballpark location was adjacent to the Suffolk Peanut Company, giving it its name. In its history, the park was also known as Smith Street Park, Athletic Park and League Park. Today, Peanut Park is still in use as a public park with a ballfield. Peanut Park is located at 308 South Saratoga Street.

Timeline

Year–by–year records

Notable alumni

Johnny Berger (1919)
Bill Black (1920-1921)
Dennis Burns (1921)
Bill Cunningham (1921, MGR)
Charlie Eckert (1919-1920)
George Gilham (1919)
Emmett McCann (1919)
Jake Munch (1919)
Joe Munson (1919)
Rube Oldring (1919, MGR) Philadelphia Baseball Wall of Fame
William Pierson (1919)
Red Proctor (1920)
Gabby Street (1915; 1920-1921, MGR) Manager: 1931 World Series Champion St. Louis Cardinals

See also
Suffolk Nuts playersSuffolk Tigers playersSuffolk Wildcats players

References

External links
Suffolk - Baseball Reference

Suffolk, Virginia
Defunct minor league baseball teams
Professional baseball teams in Virginia
Defunct baseball teams in Virginia
Baseball teams disestablished in 1919
Baseball teams established in 1920
Virginia League teams